The Bicolano people or the Bikolanos (Bikol: Mga Bikolnon) are the fourth-largest Filipino ethnolinguistic group. Their native region is commonly referred to as Bicolandia, which comprises the entirety of the Bicol Peninsula and neighboring minor islands, all in the southeast portion of Luzon. Males from the region are often referred to as Bicolano, while Bicolana may be used to refer to females.

Bicolano people are largely an agricultural and rural people, producing rice, coconuts, hemp, and spices. A great majority of Bicolanos are Roman Catholics, with many towns celebrating festivals in honor of patron saints, and Catholic Mass being celebrated daily in many of the Bicol region's churches. There also exists minority Protestant and Muslim populations among Bicolano people. An undercurrent of animism persists as well; for instance, it is common for Bicolano people to believe that whenever a supernatural entity stalks a house, they will leave centavo coins as compensation.

Bicolano people speak about a dozen closely related dialects of Bikol, largely differentiated according to cities, and closely related to other central Philippines languages, all of which belong to the Austronesian (specifically Malayo-Polynesian) superfamily of languages.

History

According to a folk epic entitled Ibalong, the people of the region were formerly called Ibalong or Ibalnong, a name believed to have been derived from Gat Ibal who ruled Sawangan (now the city of  Legazpi) in ancient times. Ibalong used to mean the "people of Ibal"; eventually, this was shortened to Ibalon. The word Bikol, which replaced Ibalon, was originally  (meaning "meandering"), a word which supposedly described the principal river of that area.

Archaeological diggings, dating back to as early as the Neolithic, and accidental findings resulting from the mining industry, road-building and railway projects in the region, reveal that the Bicol mainland is a rich storehouse of ceramic artifacts. Burial cave findings also point to the pre-Hispanic practice of using burial jars.

The Spanish influence in Bicol resulted mainly from the efforts of Augustinian and Franciscan Spanish missionaries. Through the Franciscans, the annual feast of the Virgin of Peñafrancia, the Patroness for Bicolandia, was started. The Catholic priest Miguel Robles asked a local artist to carve a replica of the statue of the Virgin in Salamanca; now the statue is celebrated through an annual fluvial parade in Naga City.

Bicolanos actively participated in the national resistance to the Spanish, American and Japanese occupations, led by two well-known militants, Simeón Ola and Governor Wenceslao Vinzons. Historically, the Bicolano people have been among the most resistant to foreign occupation, and the region was very hard for the central government to control until the end of World War II.

Area
Bicolanos live in the Bicol Region, which occupies the southeastern part of Luzon, now containing the provinces of Albay, Camarines Norte, Camarines Sur, Catanduanes and Sorsogon and Masbate (although the majority of Masbate's population are a subgroup of Visayans). Many Bicolanos also live in the southeastern towns of the Calabarzon province of Quezon.

Demographics
Bicolanos numbered 6,082,165 in 2020. They are descended from Austronesian peoples who came from Taiwan during the Iron Age. Many Bicolanos also have some Han Chinese, Arab, and Spanish admixtures; most of the townsfolk have small traces of each heritage. Bicolanos have a high percentage of Spanish introgression; a government-sponsored study showing that 20 percent of the population have Hispanic ancestry. Bicolanos are also the ethnic group with the second largest amount of Spaniards/Hispanics as a percentage of the population, after Chavacanos.

Culture and traits

Cuisine

Bicolanos supposedly have a high tolerance for eating chili food or foods which are highly spiced. The Bicolano cuisine is primarily noted for the prominent use of chili peppers and gata (coconut milk) in its food. A classic example is gulay na lada, known outside the region as Bicol Express, a well-loved dish using siling labuyo (native small chilies) and coconut milk. Meals are generally rich in carbohydrates, and vegetables are almost always cooked in coconut milk; meat recipes include pochero, adobo, tapa and dinuguan. Commonly eaten fish are mackerel and anchovy; in Lake Buhi, the sinarapan or tabyos (known as the smallest fish in the world) is common.

Livelihood
Copra processing and abacá stripping are generally done by hand. Fishing is also an important industry, and the supply of fish is normally abundant from May through September. Organized commercial fishing makes use of costly nets and motor-powered and electric-lighted boats or launches called palakaya or basnigan. Mining and the manufacture of various items from abaca are important industries. The former started when the Spaniards discovered the Paracale mines in Camarines Norte.

Coconut and abacá are two dollar-earning products grown in the coastal valleys, hillsides or slopes of several fertile volcanoes. The Bicol River basin or rice granary provide the peasants rice, corn, and root crops for food and a small cash surplus when crops evade the dreaded but frequent typhoons. For land preparation, carabao-drawn plough and harrow are generally used. Sickles are used for cutting rice stalks; threshing is done either by stepping on or beating the rice straws with basbas, and cleaning is done with the use of the nigo (winnowing basket).

Cultural values
As in other neighboring regions, men still expect the Bicolana women, both before and after marriage, to do the majority of household work, while Bicolano men are still expected to be the primary source of income and financial support of their family. Close family ties and religiosity are important traits for survival in the typhoon-prone physical environment. Related to these, there are annual rituals like the pabasa, tanggal, fiestas and flores de mayo.

On the whole, the value system of the Bicolanos shows the influence of Spanish religious doctrines and American materialism merged with traditional animistic beliefs. Consequently, it is a multicultural system that evolved through the years to accommodate the realities of the erratic climate in a varied geographical setting. Such traits can be gleaned from numerous folk tales and folk songs that abound, the most known of which is the Sarung Banggi. The heroic stories reflect such traits as kindness, a determination to conquer evil forces, resourcefulness and courage.

To suit the tropical climate, Bicolanos use light material for their houses; others now have bungalows to withstand the impact of strong typhoons. Light, western-styled clothes are predominantly used now. The typical Bicolano wears light, western-styled clothes similar to those of other Filipinos in urban centers. Seldom, if ever, do Bicolanos weave  or piña for clothing as in the past;  is reserved now for pillow cases, mosquito nets, fishing nets, bags and other decorative items.

Bicolanos observe an annual festival in honor of the Our Lady of Peñafrancia on the third Sunday of September. The City of Naga comes alive. During the celebration, a jostling crowd of all-male devotees carries the image of the Virgin on their shoulders to the Naga Metropolitan Cathedral, while shouting Viva La Virgen! For the next nine days people, mostly Bicolanos, come for an annual visit, light candles and kiss the cult image of the Virgin. To the Bicolanos, this affair is religious and cultural as well. Every night, shows are held at the plaza the year's biggest cockfights take place, bicycle races are held and the river, a lively boat race precedes the fluvial procession. At noon of the third Saturday of the month, the devotees carry the image on their shoulders in procession to the packed waterfront. On the ninth day of the festivities, The Virgin of Peñafrancia is brought to her home, to the Minor Basilica of the Our Lady of Peñafrancia via a grand fluvial procession in the Naga River. This celebration of the Bicolanos is considered one of the largest Marian celebrations in Asia.

Pre-colonial indigenous religion

Immortals

Gugurang: the supreme god; causes the pit of Mayon volcano to rumble when he is displeased; cut Mt. Malinao in hald with a thunderbolt; the god of good
Asuang: brother of Gugurang; an evil god who wanted Gugurang's fire, and gathered evil spirits and advisers to cause immortality and crime to reign; vanquished by Gugurang but his influence still lingers
Assistants of Gugurang
Linti: controls lightning
Dalodog: controls thunder
Unnamed Giant: supports the world; movement from his index finger causes a small earthquake, while movement from his third finger causes strong ones; if he moves his whole body, the earth will be destroyed
Languiton: the god of the sky
Tubigan: the god of the water
Dagat: goddess of the sea
Paros: god of the wind; married to Dagat
Daga: son of Dagat and Paros; inherited his father's control of the wind; instigated an unsuccessfully rebellion against his grandfather, Languit, and died; his body became the earth
Adlao: son of Dagat and Paros; joined Daga's rebellion and died; his body became the sun; in another myth, he was alive and during a battle, he cut one of Bulan's arm and hit Bulan's eyes, where the arm was flattened and became the earth, while Bulan's tears became the rivers and seas
Bulan: son of Dagat and Paros; joined Daga's rebellion and died; his body became the moon; in another myth, he was alive and from his cut arm, the earth was established, and from his tears, the rivers and seas were established
Bitoon: daughter of Dagat and Paros; accidentally killed by Languit during a rage against his grandsons' rebellion; her shattered body became the stars
Unnamed God: a sun god who fell in love with the mortal, Rosa; refused to light the world until his father consented to their marriage; he afterwards visited Rosa, but forgetting to remove his powers over fire, he accidentally burned Rosa's whole village until nothing but hot springs remained
Magindang: the god of fishing who leads fishermen in getting a good fish catch through sounds and signs
Okot: the forest god whose whistle would lead hunters to their prey
Bakunawa: a serpent that seeks to swallow the moon
Haliya: the goddess of the moon
Batala: a good god who battled against Kalaon
Kalaon: an evil god of destruction
Son of Kalaon: son of Kalaon who defied his evil father's wishes
Onos: freed the great flood that changed the land's features
Oryol: a wily serpent who appeared as a beautiful maiden with a seductive voice; admired the hero Handyong's bravery and gallantry, leading her to aid the hero in clearing the region of beasts until peace came into the land

Mortals

Baltog: the hero who slew the giant wild boar Tandayag
Handyong: the hero who cleared the land of beasts with the aid of Oryol; crafted the people's first laws, which created a period for a variety of human inventions
Bantong: the hero who single-handedly slew the half-man half-beast Rabot
Dinahong: the first potter; a pygmy who taught the people how to cook and make pottery
Ginantong: made the first plow, harrow, and other farming tools
Hablom: the inventor of the first weaving loom and bobbins
Kimantong: the first person to fashion the rudder called timon, the sail called layag, the plow called arado, the harrow called surod, the ganta and other measures, the roller, the yoke, the bolo, and the hoe
Sural: the first person to have thought of a syllabary; carved the first writing on a white rock-slab from Libong
Gapon: polished the rock-slab where the first writing was on
Takay: a lovely maiden who drowned during the great flood; transformed into the water hyacinth in Lake Bato
Rosa: a sun god's lover, who perished after the sun god accidentally burned her entire village

See also 

 Tagalog people
 Kapampangan people
 Ilocano people
 Ivatan people
 Igorot people
 Pangasinan people
 Negrito
 Visayan people
 Cebuano people
 Boholano people
 Hiligaynon people
 Waray people
 Lumad
Moro people

References

External links

 
Ethnic groups in the Philippines
Ethnic groups in Luzon
Bicolano